Lettera aperta a un giornale della sera (internationally released as Open Letter to an Evening Daily and Open Letter to an Evening Newspaper) is a 1970 Italian drama film directed by Francesco Maselli. It is centered upon the crisis of the Communist intellectuals after the 1968 protests.

Cast 
 Nino Dal Fabbro: prof. Nino Dal Fabbro 
 Laura De Marchi: Dublino's wife
 Daniele Dublino: Dublino 
 Fabienne Fabre: The student 
 Piero Faggioni: Faggioni
 Graziella Galvani: Graziella 
 Lorenza Guerrieri: Lorenza 
 Monica Strebel: Monica 
 Daniela Surina: Countess Surina 
 Nanni Loy: Dosi 
 Vittorio Duse: Butler
 Nicole Karen
 Tanya Lopert

References

External links

1970 films
Films directed by Francesco Maselli
Politics in fiction
Italian drama films
Films about communism
1970s Italian films